The discography of Japanese musical act Rip Slyme consists of ten studio albums, four compilation albums, two extended plays, one live album, eight video albums and thirty-three singles. Rip Slyme debuted as an independent act on File Records in 1995, releasing material with them until their major label debut under Warner Music Japan in 2000. The band's second album under Warner, Tokyo Classic (2002) was a commercial success, selling over 1,000,000 copies.

Some of the band's most commercially successful songs include "Rakuen Baby" (2002) and "Nettaiya" (2007), summer-themed songs that have both been certified Platinum or higher by the Recording Industry Association of Japan.

Rip Slyme collaborated with the rock band Quruli twice in 2006, when they released the singles "Lovi" and "Juice" simultaneously. The group have worked together with guitarist Tomoyasu Hotei twice: once in 2006 on the single "Battle Funkastic" that mashed-up Rip Slyme's "Funkastic" with Hotei's "Battle Without Honor or Humanity" (2000), and in 2011 when Rip Slyme recorded a cover of Hotei's song "Bambina" for his collaborations album All Time Super Guest.

Studio albums

Compilation albums

Extended plays

Remix albums

Live albums

Box sets

Singles

As lead artists

As featured artists

Promotional singles

Video albums

Notes

References

Discographies of Japanese artists
Hip hop discographies